Duchess Frederica of Württemberg (1699–1781), was a German abbess. She was the favorite of the queen of Denmark, Sophie Magdalene of Brandenburg-Kulmbach, and the Abbess of the Danish Protestant convent Vallø stift in 1738–1743.

Life 
She was born to Frederick Augustus, Duke of Württemberg-Neuenstadt and Albertine Sophie Esther, Countess of Eberstein (1661-1728). 

She never married, and after the death of her father in 1716, she lived with her mother in Gochsheim Castle until her mother's death in 1728.  She was, for a time, lady-in-waiting to Johanna Elisabeth of Baden-Durlach. Frederica was a favorite of the Danish queen, whose favoritism of Germans was disliked, and was awarded by her with her order and the lucrative post of abbess. She was not popular at the Danish royal court, where she was disliked because of her sharp tongue and was involved in a conflict with the queen's sister, Sophie Caroline of Brandenburg-Kulmbach. In 1743, she left Denmark and returned to the castle in Neuenstadt.

She was a Dame of the Ordre de l'Union Parfaite.

References
 Frederikke, Hertuginde af Württemberg i Carl Frederik Bricka, Dansk biografisk Lexikon (första utgåvan, 1891)
 Sönke Lorenz, Dieter Mertens, Volker Press (Hrsg.): Das Haus Württemberg. Ein biographisches Lexikon. Kohlhammer Verlag, Stuttgart 1997, S. 230, Nr. 4.4.12: Friederike

Court of Christian VI of Denmark
18th-century Danish women
1781 deaths
1699 births
Danish royal favourites
Ordre de l'Union Parfaite
Danish abbesses
18th-century German nuns
Daughters of monarchs